Jet engine performance is the understanding of how, in jet engines, a particular fuel flow produces a definite amount of thrust at a particular point in the flight envelope. The behavior of a jet engine and its effect both on the aircraft and the environment are categorized into many different engineering areas. These areas include combustion which relates to emissions, and rotor dynamics which is the area relating to origin of vibrations transmitted to the airframe. Performance is the subject of a specialized discipline within aero-engine design and development.

In fixed-wing aircraft driven by one or more jet engines, certain aspects of performance such as thrust relate directly to the safe operation of the aircraft whereas other aspects of the engine operation such as noise and engine emissions affect the environment. The thrust, noise and emission elements of the operation of a jet engine are of vital importance in the takeoff phase of operation of the aircraft. The thrust and fuel consumption elements, and their variation with altitude, are of vital importance in the climb and cruise phases of operation of the aircraft.

The fundamental performance task for a single shaft turbojet is to match the operation of the compressor, turbine and propelling nozzle. For example, the way the compressor operates is determined by the flow resistances behind it, which occur in the combustor, turbine, tailpipe and propelling nozzle.

Matching may be defined as designing, sizing, and manipulating the operating characteristics of the compressor, turbine and propelling nozzle.

Three fundamental observations are built upon as outlined below to develop the required understanding to match the components efficiently. The flow through the compressor is the same as that through the turbine. The speeds are the same. The power produced by the turbine equals that absorbed by the compressor. In addition, the flow resistance seen by the compressor is determined by the two restrictors downstream, namely the turbine nozzle area and the propelling nozzle exit area.

The above three ties between the compressor and turbine are adjusted and refined to account for the flows and powers not being equal due to, for example, compressor flow and electric and hydraulic power being diverted to the airframe. Thus the performance is understood and defined by using the practical engineering application of thermodynamics and aerodynamics.

This article covers a wide scope of the discipline of jet engine performance.

Navigating this article
Specific values of thrust and fuel consumption are promised to a prospective aircraft customer, and these are derived using procedures detailed in section "Design point performance equations" and "Simple off-design calculation". An explanation for "off-design" is given in "General".

An aircraft receives pneumatic, electric and hydraulic power in return for some of the fuel it supplies. This is mentioned in Installation Effects. These effects define the difference between the performance of an uninstalled engine (as measured on a test bed) and one installed on an aircraft.

When air is taken from the compressor and used to cool the turbine it has an adverse effect on the amount of fuel required to give the required thrust. This is covered in "Cooling Bleeds".

The effect of fundamental design changes to the engine, such as increased pressure ratio and turbine inlet temperature, is covered in "Cycle improvements'. Ways to increase the pressure ratio are also covered.

The effects of over-fueling and under-fueling which occur with changes in thrust demand are covered in the "Transient model".

There is an explanation of the Husk plot which is a concise way of summarizing the performance of the engine.

The thrust available is restricted by the turbine temperature limit at high ambient temperatures as explained in the "Rated performance" sections.

Design point

TS diagram
 Temperature vs. entropy (TS) diagrams (see example RHS) are usually used to illustrate the cycle of gas turbine engines. Entropy represents the degree of disorder of the molecules in the fluid and tends to increase as energy is converted between different forms, e.g. chemical and mechanical.

The TS diagram shown on the RHS is for a single spool turbojet, where a single drive shaft connects the turbine unit with the compressor unit.
 
Apart from stations 0 and 8s, stagnation pressure and stagnation temperature are used. Station 0 is ambient. Stagnation quantities are frequently used in gas turbine cycle studies, because no knowledge of the flow velocity is required.

The processes depicted are:

Freestream (stations 0 to 1) 
 
In the example, the aircraft is stationary, so stations 0 and 1 are coincident. Station 1 is not depicted on the diagram.

Intake (stations 1 to 2)
  
In the example, a 100% intake pressure recovery is assumed, so stations 1 and 2 are coincident.

Compression (stations 2 to 3)
  
The ideal process would appear vertical on a TS diagram. In the real process, there is friction, turbulence, and, possibly, shock losses, making the exit temperature, for a given pressure ratio, higher than ideal. The shallower the positive slope on the TS diagram, the less efficient the compression process.
   
Combustion (stations 3 to 4)
  
Heat (usually by burning fuel) is added, raising the temperature of the fluid.  There is an associated pressure loss, some of which is unavoidable

Turbine (stations 4 to 5)
  
The temperature rise in the compressor dictates that there will be an associated  temperature drop across the turbine. Ideally the process would be vertical on a TS diagram. However, in the real process, friction and turbulence cause the pressure drop to be greater than ideal. The shallower the negative slope on the TS diagram, the less efficient the expansion process.
 
Jetpipe (stations 5 to 8)
  
In the example the jetpipe is very short, so there is no pressure loss. Consequently, stations 5 and 8 are coincident with the TS diagram.

Nozzle (stations 8 to 8s)
   
These two stations are both at the throat of the (convergent) nozzle. Station 8s represents static conditions. Not shown on the example TS diagram is the expansion process, external to the nozzle, down to ambient pressure.

Design point performance equations

In theory, any combination of flight condition/throttle setting can be nominated as the engine performance Design Point. Usually, however, the Design Point corresponds to the highest corrected flow at the inlet to the compression system (e.g. Top-of-Climb, Mach 0.85, 35,000 ft, ISA).

The design point net thrust of any jet engine can be estimated by working through the engine cycle, step by step. Below are the equations for a single spool turbojet.

Freestream

The stagnation (or total) temperature in the freestream approaching the engine can be estimated using the following equation, derived from the Steady Flow Energy Equation:

The corresponding freestream stagnation (or total) pressure is:

Intake

Since there is no work or heat loss in the intake under steady-state conditions:

However, friction and shock losses in the intake system must be accounted for:

Where RR is the ram recovery factor, corresponding to the loss of total pressure in the inlet.

Compressor

The actual discharge temperature of the compressor, assuming a polytropic efficiency is given by:

Normally a compressor pressure ratio is assumed, so:

Combustor

A turbine rotor inlet temperature is usually assumed:

The pressure loss in the combustor reduces the pressure at turbine entry:

Turbine

Equating the turbine and compressor powers and ignoring any power offtake (e.g. to drive an alternator, pump, etc.), we have:

A simplifying assumption sometimes made is for the addition of fuel flow to be exactly offset by an overboard compressor bleed, so mass flow remains constant throughout the cycle.

The pressure ratio across the turbine can be calculated, assuming a turbine polytropic efficiency:

Obviously:

Jetpipe

Since, under Steady-State conditions, there is no work or heat loss in the jetpipe:

However, the jetpipe pressure loss must be accounted for:

Nozzle

Is the nozzle choked? The nozzle is choked when the throat Mach number = 1.0. This occurs when the nozzle pressure ratio reaches or exceeds a critical level:

If  then the nozzle is CHOKED.

If  then the nozzle is UNCHOKED.

Choked Nozzle

The following calculation method is only suitable for choked nozzles.

Assuming the nozzle is choked, the nozzle static temperature is calculated as follows:

Similarly for the nozzle static pressure:

The nozzle throat velocity (squared) is calculated using the Steady Flow Energy Equation:

The density of the gases at the nozzle throat is given by:

Nozzle throat effective area is estimated as follows:

Gross thrust

There are two terms in the nozzle gross thrust equation; ideal momentum thrust and ideal pressure thrust. The latter term is only non-zero if the nozzle is choked:

Unchoked nozzle

The following special calculation is required if the nozzle happens to be unchoked.

Once unchoked, the nozzle static pressure is equal to ambient pressure:

The nozzle static temperature is calculated from the nozzle total/static pressure ratio:

The nozzle throat velocity (squared) is calculated, as before, using the steady flow energy equation:

Gross thrust

The nozzle pressure thrust term is zero if the nozzle is unchoked, so only the Momentum Thrust needs to be calculated:

Ram drag

In general, there is a ram drag penalty for taking air onboard via the intake:

Net thrust

The ram drag must be deducted from the nozzle gross thrust:

The calculation of the combustor fuel flow is beyond the scope of this text but is proportional to the combustor entry airflow and a function of the combustor temperature rise.

Note that mass flow is the sizing parameter: doubling the airflow, doubles the thrust and the fuel flow. However, the specific fuel consumption (fuel flow/net thrust) is unaffected, assuming scale effects are neglected.

Similar design point calculations can be done for other types of jet engine e.g. turbofan, turboprop, ramjet, etc.

The method of the calculation shown above is fairly crude but is useful for gaining a basic understanding of aeroengine performance. Most engine manufacturers use a more exact method, known as True Specific Heat. High pressures and temperatures at elevated levels of supersonic speeds would invoke the use of even more exotic calculations: i.e. Frozen Chemistry and Equilibrium Chemistry.

Worked example 

Calculate the net thrust of the following single spool turbojet cycle at Sea Level Static, ISA, using Imperial units for illustration purposes:

Key design parameters:

Intake air mass flow, 
 
(45.359 kg/s in SI units)

Assume the gas flow is constant throughout the engine.

Overall pressure ratio, 

Turbine rotor inlet temperature, 

(factor-up by 1.8, if working with degrees Rankine) 
 
Design component performance assumptions:

Intake pressure recovery factor, Compressor polytropic efficiency, Turbine polytropic efficiency, Combustor pressure loss is 5%, so the combustor pressure ratio Jetpipe pressure loss is 1%, so the jetpipe pressure ratio Nozzle thrust coefficient, Constants:The ratio of specific heats for air, The ratio of specific heats for combustion products, Specific heat at constant pressure for air, (use 1.004646 kW·s/(kg·K) when working with SI units
and use 0.3395 hp·s/(lb·°R) if working with American units)

Specific heat at constant pressure for combustion products,  
(use 1.1462 kW·s/(kg·K) when working with SI units 
and use 0.387363889 hp·s/(lb·°R) if working with American units)  
 
Acceleration of gravity,  
(use 10.00 when working with SI units) 
 
Mechanical equivalent of heat, (use 1 when working with SI units)

Gas constant, (use 0.287052 kN·m/(kg·K) when working with SI units 
and use 53.3522222 ft·lbf/(lb·°R) if working with American units including degrees Rankine)Ambient conditionsA sea level pressure altitude implies the following:

Ambient pressure,  (assume 101.325 kN/m² if working in SI units)

Sea level, ISA conditions (i.e. Standard Day) imply the following:

Ambient temperature, (Note: this is an absolute temperature i.e. )

(Use 518.67 °R, if working with American units) 
 FreestreamSince the engine is static, both the flight velocity,  
and the flight Mach number, are zero

So:IntakeCompressorCombustorTurbineJetpipeNozzleSince , the nozzle is CHOKEDChoked Nozzle  NOTE: inclusion of 144 in²/ft² to obtain density in lb/ft³.NOTE: inclusion of 144 in²/ft² to obtain an area in in².Gross ThrustThe first term is the momentum thrust which contributes most of the nozzle gross thrust. Because the nozzle is choked (which is the norm on a turbojet), the second term, the pressure thrust, is non-zero.Ram DragThe ram drag in this particular example is zero, because the engine is stationary and the flight velocity is therefore zero.Net thrustTo retain accuracy, only the final answer should be rounded off.

Cooling Bleeds
The above calculations assume that the fuel flow added in the combustor completely offsets the bleed air extracted at compressor delivery to cool the turbine system. This is pessimistic, since the bleed air is assumed to be dumped directly overboard (thereby bypassing the propulsion nozzle) and unable to contribute to the thrust of the engine.

In a more sophisticated performance model, the cooling air for the first row of (static) turbine nozzle guide vanes (immediately downstream of the combustor) can be safely disregarded, since for a given (HP) rotor inlet temperature it does not affect either the combustor fuel flow or the net thrust of the engine. However, the turbine rotor cooling air must be included in such a model. The rotor cooling bleed air is extracted from compressor delivery and passes along narrow passageways before being injected into the base of the rotating blades. The bleed air negotiates a complex set of passageways within the aerofoil extracting heat before being dumped into the gas stream adjacent to the blade surface. In a sophisticated model, the turbine rotor cooling air is assumed to quench the main gas stream emerging from turbine, reducing its temperature, but also increasing its mass flow:

i.e.The bleed air cooling the turbine discs is treated in a similar manner. The usual assumption is that the low-energy disc cooling air cannot contribute to the engine cycle until it has passed through one row of blades or vanes.

Naturally, any bleed air returned to the cycle (or dumped overboard) must also be deducted from the main airflow at the point it is bled from the compressor. If some of the cooling air is bled from part way along the compressor (i.e. interstage), the power absorbed by the unit must be adjusted accordingly.

Cycle improvements
Increasing the design overall pressure ratio of the compression system raises the combustor entry temperature. Therefore, at a fixed fuel flow and airflow, there is an increase in turbine inlet temperature. Although the higher temperature rise across the compression system implies a larger temperature drop over the turbine system, the nozzle temperature is unaffected, because the same amount of heat is being added to the total system. There is, however, a rise in nozzle pressure, because the turbine expansion ratio increases more slowly than the overall pressure ratio (which is inferred by the divergence of the constant pressure lines on the TS diagram). Consequently, net thrust increases, implying a specific fuel consumption (fuel flow/net thrust) decrease. Therefore, turbojets can be made more fuel-efficient by raising the overall pressure ratio and turbine inlet temperature in unison.

However, better turbine materials and/or improved vane/blade cooling are required to cope with increases in both turbine inlet temperature and compressor delivery temperature. Increasing the latter may also require better compressor materials. Also, higher combustion temperatures can potentially lead to greater emissions of nitrogen oxides, associated with acid rain.

Adding a rear stage to the compressor, to raise the overall pressure ratio, does not require a shaft speed increase, but it reduces core size and requires a smaller flow size turbine, which is expensive to change.

Alternatively, adding a zero (i.e. front) stage to the compressor, to increase the overall pressure ratio, will require an increase in shaft speed (to maintain the same blade tip Mach number on each of the original compressor stages, since the delivery temperature of each of these stages will be higher than datum). The increase in shaft speed raises the centrifugal stresses in both the turbine blade and disc. This together with increases in the hot gas and cooling air (from the compressor) temperatures implies a decrease in component lives and/or an upgrade in component materials. Adding a zero stage also induces more airflow into the engine, thereby increasing net thrust.

If the increased overall pressure ratio is obtained aerodynamically (i.e. without adding stage/s), an increase in shaft speed will still probably be required, which affects blade/disc stresses and component lives/material.

Other gas turbine engine types
Design point calculations for other gas turbine engine types are similar in format to that given above for a single spool turbojet.

The design point calculation for a two spool turbojet has two compression calculations: one for the Low Pressure (LP) Compressor and one for the High Pressure (HP) Compressor. There are also two turbine calculations: one for the HP Turbine and one for the LP Turbine.

In a two-spool unmixed turbofan, the LP Compressor calculation is usually replaced by Fan Inner (i.e. hub) and Fan Outer (i.e. tip) compression calculations. The power absorbed by these two "components" is taken as the load on the LP turbine. After the Fan Outer compression calculation, there is a Bypass Duct pressure loss/Bypass Nozzle expansion calculation. Net thrust is obtained by deducting the intake ram drag from the sum of the Core Nozzle and Bypass Nozzle gross thrusts.

A two-spool mixed turbofan design point calculation is very similar to that for an unmixed engine, except the Bypass Nozzle calculation is replaced by a Mixer calculation, where the static pressures of the core and bypass streams at the mixing plane are usually assumed to be equal.

Off-design

General

An engine is said to be running off-design if any of the following apply:

a) change of throttle setting
b) change of altitude
c) change of flight speed
d) change of climate
e) change of installation (e.g. customer bleed or power off-take or intake pressure recovery)
f) change in geometry

Although each off-design point is effectively a design point calculation, the resulting cycle (normally) has the same turbine and nozzle geometry as that at the engine design point. The final nozzle cannot be over or underfilled with the flow. This rule also applies to the turbine nozzle guide vanes, which act like small nozzles.

Simple Off-design Calculation

Design point calculations are normally done by a computer program. By the addition of an iterative loop, such a program can also be used to create a simple off-design model.

In an iteration, a calculation is undertaken using guessed values for the variables. At the end of the calculation, the constraint values are analyzed, and an attempt is made to improve the guessed values of the variables. The calculation is then repeated using the new guesses. This procedure is repeated until the constraints are within the desired tolerance (e.g. 0.1%).
 Iteration variablesThe three variables required for a single spool turbojet iteration are the key design variables:

1) some function of combustor fuel flow e.g. turbine rotor inlet temperature 2) corrected engine mass flow i.e. 3) compressor pressure ratio i.e. Iteration constraints (or matching quantities)The three constraints imposed would typically be:

2) nozzle area e.g.  vs 

3) turbine flow capacity e.g.  vs 
 
The latter two are the physical constraints that must be met, whilst the former is some measure of throttle setting.

Note: Corrected flow is the flow that would pass through a device, if the entry pressure and temperature corresponded to ambient conditions at sea level on a Standard Day.
 
Results
 
Plotted above are the results of several off-design calculations, showing the effect of throttling a jet engine from its design point condition.  This line is known as the compressor steady state (as opposed to transient) working line. Over most of the throttle range, the turbine system on a turbojet operates between choked planes. All the turbine throats are choked, as well as the final nozzle. Consequently, the turbine pressure ratio stays essentially constant. This implies a fixed. Since turbine rotor entry temperature, usually falls with throttling, the temperature drop across the turbine system, must also decrease. However, the temperature rise across the compression system, is proportional to .Consequently, the ratio  must also fall, implying a decrease in the compression system pressure ratio. The non-dimensional (or corrected flow) at the compressor exit tends to stay constant, because it 'sees', beyond the combustor, the constant corrected flow of the choked turbine. Consequently, there must be a decrease in compressor entry corrected flow, as the compressor pressure ratio falls. Therefore, the compressor steady state working line has a positive slope, as shown above, on the RHS.

The ratio  is the quantity that determines the throttle setting of the engine. So, for instance, raising intake stagnation temperature by increasing flight speed, at a constant, will cause the engine to throttle back to a lower corrected flow/pressure ratio.

Fairly obviously, when an engine is throttled-back, it will lose net thrust. This drop-in thrust is mainly caused by the reduction in air mass flow, but the reduction in turbine rotor inlet temperature and degradations in component performance will also contribute.

The simple off-design calculation outlined above is somewhat crude since it assumes:

1) no variation in compressor and turbine efficiency with throttle setting

2) no change in pressure losses with component entry flow

3) no variation in turbine flow capacity or nozzle discharge coefficient with throttle setting

Furthermore, there is no indication of relative shaft speed or compressor surge margin

Complex Off-design Calculation

A more refined off-design model can be created using compressor maps and turbine maps to predict off-design corrected mass flows, pressure ratios, efficiencies, relative shaft speeds, etc. A further refinement is to allow the component off-design pressure losses to vary with corrected mass flow, Mach number, etc.

The iteration scheme is similar to that of the Simple Off-design Calculation.

Iteration variables

Again, three variables are required for a single spool turbojet iteration, typically:

1) some function of combustor fuel flow e.g. 
 
2) compressor corrected speed e.g. 

3) an independent variable indicative of the compressor operating point up a speed line e.g. 

Therefore, compressor corrected speed replaces corrected engine mass flow and Beta replaces compressor pressure ratio.

Iteration constraints (or matching quantities)

The three constraints imposed would typically be similar to before:

2) nozzle area e.g.  vs 

3) turbine flow capacity e.g.  vs 

After the combustion calculation is completed, the implied compressor mechanical shaft speed is used to estimate the turbine corrected speed (i.e. ). Typically, the turbine load (power demanded) and entry flow and temperature are used to estimate the turbine enthalpy drop/inlet temperature (i.e. ). The estimated turbine corrected speed and enthalpy drop/inlet temperature parameters are used to obtain, from the turbine map, an estimate of the turbine corrected flow
and efficiency (i.e. ). The calculation then continues, in the usual way, through the turbine, jetpipe and nozzle. If the constraints are not within tolerance, the iteration engine makes another guess at the iteration variables and the iterative loop is restarted.

Plotted on the LHS are the results of several off-design calculations, showing the effect of throttling a jet engine from its design point condition. The line produced is similar to the working line shown above, but it is now superimposed on the compressor map and gives an indication of corrected shaft speed and compressor surge margin.

Performance model
Whatever it's sophistication, the off-design program is not only used to predict the off-design performance of the engine, but also assist in the design process (e.g. estimating maximum shaft speeds, pressures, temperatures, etc. to support component stressing). Other models will be constructed to simulate the behavior (in some detail) of the various individual components (e.g. rotor 2 of the compressor).

Installation effects

More often than not, the design point calculation is for an uninstalled engine. Installation effects are normally introduced at off-design conditions and will depend on the engine application.

A partially installed engine includes the effect of:

a) the real intake having a pressure recovery of less than 100%

b) air being bled from the compression system for cabin/cockpit conditioning and to cool the avionics

c) oil and fuel pump loads on the HP shaft

In addition, in a fully installed engine, various drags erode the effective net thrust of the engine:

1) an air intake spilling air creates drag

2) exhaust gases, exiting the hot nozzle, can scrub the external part of the nozzle plug (where applicable) and create drag

3) if the jet engine is a civil turbofan, bypass air, exiting the cold nozzle, can scrub the gas generator cowl and the submerged portion of the pylon (where applicable) and create drag

Deducting these throttle-dependent drags (where applicable) from the net thrust calculated above gives the streamtube net thrust.

There is, however, another installation effect: freestream air scrubbing an exposed fan cowl and its associated pylon (where applicable) will create drag. Deducting this term from the streamtube net thrust yields the force applied by the engine to the airframe proper.

In a typical military installation, where the engine is buried within the airframe, only some of the above installation effects apply.

Transient model

So far, we have examined steady state performance modelling.
 
A crude transient performance model can be developed by relatively minor adjustments to the off-design calculation. A transient acceleration (or deceleration) is assumed to cover a large number of small-time steps of, say, 0.01 s duration. During each time step, the shaft speed is assumed to be momentarily constant. In the modified off-design iteration,  is frozen and a new variable, the excess turbine power , allowed to float instead. After the iteration has converged, the excess power is used to estimate the change in shaft speed:

Now:

Acceleration torque = spool inertia * shaft angular acceleration

   =     /

Rearranging:

 = ( /(    ))  
 
But:

  =       /

So:

 = ( /) 

Or approximating:

 = (  /) 

This change in shaft speed is used to calculate a new (frozen) shaft speed for the next time interval:

  =    + 

The whole process, described above, is then repeated for the new time:

 =   + 

The starting point for the transient is some steady state point (e.g. Ground Idle, Sea Level Static, ISA). A ramp of fuel flow versus time is, for instance, fed into the model to simulate, say, a slam acceleration (or deceleration). The transient calculation is first undertaken for time zero, with the steady state fuel flow as the engine match, which should result in zero excess turbine power. By definition, the first transient calculation should reproduce the datum steady state point. This process is repeated until the transient simulation is completed.

The transient model described above is pretty crude, since it only takes into account inertia effects, other effects being ignored. For instance, under transient conditions the entry mass flow to a volume (e.g. jetpipe) needn't be the same as the exit mass flow; i.e. the volume could be acting as an accumulator, storing or discharging gas. Similarly, part of the engine structure (e.g. nozzle wall) could be extracting or adding heat to the gas flow, which would affect that component's discharge temperature.

During a Slam Acceleration on a single spool turbojet, the working line of the compressor tends to deviate from the steady state working line and adopt a curved path, initially going towards surge, but slowly returning to the steady state line, as the fuel flow reaches a new higher steady state value. During the initial overfuelling, the inertia of the spool tends to prevent the shaft speed from accelerating rapidly. Naturally, the extra fuel flow increases the turbine rotor entry temperature,   . Since the turbine operates between two choked planes (i.e. the turbine and nozzle throats), the turbine pressure ratio and the corresponding temperature drop/entry temperature,  remain approximately constant. Since  increases, so must the temperature drop across the turbine and the turbine power output.  This extra turbine power increases the temperature rise across the compressor and, therefore, the compressor pressure ratio. Since the corrected speed of the compressor has hardly changed, the working point tends to move upwards, along a line of roughly constant corrected speed. As time progresses the shaft begins to accelerate and the effect just described diminishes.

During a Slam Deceleration, the opposite trend is observed; the transient compressor working line goes below the steady state line.

The transient behavior of the high pressure (HP) compressor of a turbofan is similar to that described above for a single spool turbojet.

Performance software

Over the years a number of software packages have been developed to estimate the design, off-design and transient performance of various types of gas turbine engine. Most are used in-house by the various aero-engine manufacturers, but several software packages are available to the general public (e.g. NPSS http://www.npssconsortium.org, GasTurb http://www.gasturb.de, EngineSim http://www.grc.nasa.gov/WWW/K-12//airplane/ngnsim.html, GSP https://www.gspteam.com/, PROOSIS http://www.proosis.com).

Husk plot

A Husk Plot is a concise way of summarizing the performance of a jet engine. The following sections describe how the plot is generated and can be used.

Thrust/SFC loops

Specific Fuel Consumption (i.e. SFC), defined as fuel flow/net thrust, is an important parameter reflecting the overall thermal (or fuel) efficiency of an engine.

As an engine is throttled back there will be a variation of SFC with net thrust, because of changes in the engine cycle (e.g. lower overall pressure ratio) and variations in component performance (e.g. compressor efficiency). When plotted, the resultant curve is known as a thrust/SFC loop. A family of these curves can be generated at Sea Level, Standard Day, conditions over a range of flight speeds. A Husk Plot (RHS) can be developed using this family of curves. The net thrust scale is simply relabeled , where  is relative ambient pressure, whilst the SFC scale is relabeled , where  is relative ambient temperature. The resulting plot can be used to estimate engine net thrust and SFC at any altitude, flight speed and climate for a range of throttle setting.

Selecting a point on the plot, net thrust is calculated as follows:

Clearly, net thrust falls with altitude, because of the decrease in ambient pressure.

The corresponding SFC is calculated as follows:

At a given point on the Husk Plot, SFC falls with decreasing ambient temperature (e.g. increasing altitude or colder climate). The basic reason why SFC increases with flight speed is the implied increase in ram drag.

Although a Husk Plot is a concise way of summarizing the performance of a jet engine, the predictions obtained at altitude will be slightly
optimistic. For instance, because ambient temperature remains constant above 11,000 m (36,089 ft) altitude, at a fixed non-dimensional point the Husk plot would yield no change in SFC with increasing altitude. In reality, there would be a small, steady, increase in SFC, owing to the falling Reynolds number.

Thrust lapse

The nominal net thrust quoted for a jet engine usually refers to the Sea Level Static (SLS) condition, either for the International Standard Atmosphere (ISA) or a hot day condition (e.g. ISA+10 °C). As an example, the GE90-76B has a take-off static thrust of 76,000 lbf (360 kN) at SLS, ISA+15 °C.

Naturally, net thrust will decrease with altitude, because of the lower air density. There is also, however, a flight speed effect.

Initially as the aircraft gains speed down the runway, there will be little increase in nozzle pressure and temperature, because the ram rise in the intake is very small. There will also be little change in mass flow. Consequently, nozzle gross thrust initially only increases marginally with flight speed. However, being an air breathing engine (unlike a conventional rocket) there is a penalty for taking on-board air from the atmosphere. This is known as ram drag. Although the penalty is zero at static conditions, it rapidly increases with flight speed causing the net thrust to be eroded.

As flight speed builds up after take-off, the ram rise in the intake starts to have a significant effect upon nozzle pressure/temperature and intake airflow, causing nozzle gross thrust to climb more rapidly. This term now starts to offset the still increasing ram drag, eventually causing net thrust to start to increase. In some engines, the net thrust at say Mach 1.0, sea level can even be slightly greater than the static thrust. Above Mach 1.0, with a subsonic inlet design, shock losses tend to decrease net thrust, however a suitably designed supersonic inlet can give a lower reduction in intake pressure recovery, allowing net thrust to continue to climb in the supersonic regime.

The thrust lapse described above depends on the design specific thrust and, to a certain extent, on how the engine is rated with intake temperature. Three possible ways of rating an engine are depicted on the above Husk Plot. The variation of net thrust with flight Mach number can be clearly seen on the Husk Plot.

Other trends

The Husk Plot can also be used to indicate trends in the following parameters:

1) turbine entry temperature

So as ambient temperature falls (through increasing altitude or a cooler climate), turbine entry temperature must also fall to stay at the same non-dimensional
point on the Husk Plot. All the other non-dimensional groups (e.g. corrected flow, axial and peripheral Mach numbers, pressure ratios, efficiencies, etc. will also stay constant).

2) mechanical shaft speed

As ambient temperature falls (through increasing altitude or a cooler climate), mechanical shaft speed must also decrease to remain at the same non-dimensional point.

By definition, compressor corrected speed, must remain constant at a given non-dimensional point.

Rated Performance

Civil

 Nowadays, civil engines are usually flat-rated on net thrust up to a 'kink-point' climate. So at a given flight condition, net thrust is held approximately constant over a very wide range of ambient temperature, by increasing (HP) turbine rotor inlet temperature (RIT or SOT). However, beyond the kink-point, SOT is held constant and net thrust starts to fall for further increases in ambient temperature. Consequently, aircraft fuel load and/or payload must be decreased.

Usually, for a given rating, the kink-point SOT is held constant, regardless of altitude or flight speed.

Some engines have a special rating, known as the 'Denver Bump'. This invokes a higher RIT than normal, to enable fully laden aircraft to Take-off safely from Denver, CO in the summer months. Denver Airport is extremely hot in the summer and the runways are over a mile above sea level. Both of these factors affect engine thrust

Military

 The rating systems used on military engines vary from engine to engine. A typical military rating structure is shown on the left. Such a rating system maximizes the thrust available from the engine cycle chosen, whilst respecting the aerodynamic and mechanical limits imposed on the turbomachinery. If there is adequate thrust to meet the aircraft's mission in a particular range of intake temperature, the engine designer may elect to truncate the schedule shown, to lower the turbine rotor inlet temperature and, thereby, improve engine life.

At low intake temperatures, the engine tends to operate at maximum corrected speed or corrected flow. As intake temperature rises, a limit on (HP) turbine rotor inlet temperature (SOT) takes effect, progressively reducing corrected flow. At even higher intake temperatures, a limit on compressor delivery temperature (T3) is invoked, which decreases both SOT and corrected flow.

 The effect of design intake temperature is shown on the right-hand side.

An engine with a low design T1 combines high corrected flow with high rotor turbine temperature (SOT), maximizing net thrust at low T1 conditions (e.g. Mach 0.9, 30000 ft, ISA). However, although turbine rotor inlet temperature stays constant as T1 increases, there is a steady decrease in corrected flow, resulting in poor net thrust at high T1 conditions (e.g. Mach 0.9, sea level, ISA).

Although an engine with a high design T1 has a high corrected flow at low T1 conditions, the SOT is low, resulting in a poor net thrust. Only at high T1 conditions is there the combination of a high corrected flow and a high SOT, to give good thrust characteristics.

A compromise between these two extremes would be to design for a medium intake temperature (say 290 K).

As T1 increases along the SOT plateau, the engines will throttle back, causing both a decrease in corrected airflow and overall pressure ratio. As shown, the chart implies a common T3 limit for both the low and high design T1 cycles. Roughly speaking, the T3 limit will correspond to a common overall pressure ratio at the T3 breakpoint. Although both cycles will increase throttle setting as T1 decreases, the low design T1 cycle has a greater 'spool-up' before hitting the corrected speed limit. Consequently, the low design T1 cycle has a higher design overall pressure ratio.

Nomenclature

   flow area
  calculated nozzle effective throat area
 design point nozzle effective throat area  
 nozzle geometric throat area 
 shaft angular acceleration 
 arbitrary lines which dissect the corrected speed lines on a compressor characteristic  
 specific heat at constant pressure for air
  specific heat at constant pressure for combustion products
 calculated nozzle discharge coefficient 
 thrust coefficient
 ambient pressure/Sea Level ambient pressure
 turbine enthalpy drop/inlet temperature
  change in mechanical shaft speed
 excess shaft power
  excess shaft torque
 compressor polytropic efficiency
  turbine polytropic efficiency
   acceleration of gravity
  gross thrust
  net thrust
  ram drag
  ratio of specific heats for air
  ratio of specific heats for combustion products
   spool inertia
   mechanical equivalent of heat
   constant
   constant
   constant
   flight Mach number
 compressor mechanical shaft speed
 compressor corrected shaft speed
 turbine corrected shaft speed
   static pressure
   stagnation (or total) pressure
 compressor pressure ratio
  intake pressure recovery factor
   gas constant
 density
 specific fuel consumption  
 stator outlet temperature  
 (turbine) rotor inlet temperature
   static temperature or time
  stagnation (or total) temperature
  intake stagnation temperature
  compressor delivery total temperature
 ambient temperature/Sea Level, Standard Day, ambient temperature
 total temperature/Sea Level, Standard Day, ambient temperature
  velocity
 mass flow
 calculated turbine entry corrected flow
 compressor corrected inlet flow 
 design point turbine entry corrected flow 
 corrected entry flow from turbine characteristic (or map) 
 combustor fuel flow

Notes

References
 Kerrebrock, Jack L. (1992), Aircraft Engines and Gas Turbines, The MIT Press, Cambridge, Massachusetts USA.  

Jet engines
Aircraft performance